In mathematical logic, an axiom schema (plural: axiom schemata or axiom schemas) generalizes the notion of axiom.

Formal definition
An axiom schema is a formula in the metalanguage of an axiomatic system, in which one or more schematic variables appear. These variables, which are metalinguistic constructs, stand for any term or subformula of the system, which may or may not be required to satisfy certain conditions. Often, such conditions require that certain variables be free, or that certain variables not appear in the subformula or term.

Finite axiomatization
Given that the number of possible subformulas or terms that can be inserted in place of a schematic variable is countably infinite, an axiom schema stands for a countably infinite set of axioms. This set can usually be defined recursively. A theory that can be axiomatized without schemata is said to be finitely axiomatized. Theories that can be finitely axiomatized are seen as a bit more metamathematically elegant, even if they are less practical for deductive work.

Examples
Two well known instances of axiom schemata are the:
 induction schema that is part of Peano's axioms for the arithmetic of the natural numbers;
 axiom schema of replacement that is part of the standard ZFC axiomatization of set theory.
Czesław Ryll-Nardzewski proved that Peano arithmetic cannot be finitely axiomatized, and Richard Montague proved that ZFC cannot be finitely axiomatized. Hence, the axiom schemata cannot be eliminated from these theories. This is also the case for quite a few other axiomatic theories in mathematics, philosophy, linguistics, etc.

Finitely axiomatized theories
All theorems of ZFC are also theorems of von Neumann–Bernays–Gödel set theory, but the latter can be finitely axiomatized. The set theory New Foundations can be finitely axiomatized, but only with some loss of elegance.

In higher-order logic
Schematic variables in first-order logic are usually trivially eliminable in second-order logic, because a schematic variable is often a placeholder for any property or relation over the individuals of the theory. This is the case with the schemata of Induction and Replacement mentioned above. Higher-order logic allows quantified variables to range over all possible properties or relations.

See also

 Axiom schema of predicative separation
 Axiom schema of replacement
 Axiom schema of specification

Notes

References
 .
 
 .
 .
 .
 .

Formal systems